Limavatnet is a lake in the municipality of Gjesdal in Rogaland county, Norway.  The  lake lies between the villages of Ålgård and Gjesdal.  On the western end of the lake, the European route E39 highway crosses the lake on the Vaula Bridge.  The lake Edlandsvatnet lies immediately to the west of the bridge. The hydronym Lima, belonging to the lake, adjacent settlements, and associated surname, is, according to Oddvar Nes, likely derived from the Indo-European root "lei-", which means "wet, calm water".

See also
List of lakes in Norway

References

Gjesdal
Lakes of Rogaland